Nachida Laïfa (born 17 October 1982) is an Algerian former footballer who played as a forward. She has been a member of the Algeria women's national team.

Club career
Laïfa has played for ASE Alger Centre in Algeria.

International career
Laïfa capped for Algeria at senior level during two Africa Women Cup of Nations editions (2006 and 2014).

References

1982 births
Living people
Footballers from Algiers
Algerian women's footballers
Women's association football forwards
Algeria women's international footballers
21st-century Algerian people